Anita Cornwell (born September 23, 1923) is an American lesbian feminist author. In 1983 she wrote the first collection of essays by an African-American lesbian, Black Lesbian in White America.

Biography
Born in Greenwood, South Carolina, Cornwell moved to Pennsylvania at the age of 16, living first in Yeadon with her aunt, then in Philadelphia with her mother, who moved north when Cornwell was aged 18. Cornwell has one sibling, an older brother. She graduated from Temple University with a B.S. in journalism and the social sciences in 1948. She worked as a journalist for local newspapers and a clerical worker for government agencies.

Cornwell's early writings, published in The Ladder and The Negro Digest in the 1950s, were among the first to identify the author as a black lesbian, and other publications where her work has appeared include Feminist Review, Labyrinth, National Leader, and the Los Angeles Free Press.

Published on October 1, 1983, Cornwell's first book Black Lesbian in White America, which includes her essays and an interview with activist Audre Lorde, is widely noted as the first collection of essays by a black lesbian.

Cornwell was honored by the Annual Lambda Literary Festival, which was held in Philadelphia in 2000.

Bibliography
 Black Lesbian in White America (essays, Naiad Press, 1983)
 The Girls of Summer (young-adult novel, 1989)

References

1923 births
African-American women writers
African-American writers
American feminist writers
African-American feminists
LGBT African Americans
Lesbian feminists
American lesbian writers
American LGBT rights activists
LGBT people from South Carolina
Living people
Temple University alumni
Political activists from Pennsylvania
Writers from Philadelphia
People from Greenwood, South Carolina
21st-century African-American people
21st-century African-American women
20th-century African-American people
21st-century American LGBT people
20th-century African-American women